Landon Christopher Ferraro (born August 8, 1991) is a Canadian professional ice hockey centre who is currently playing under contract with Kölner Haie of the Deutsche Eishockey Liga (DEL). Ferraro was drafted 32nd overall by the Detroit Red Wings in the 2009 NHL Entry Draft, with whom he began his NHL career.

Playing career

Junior
Ferraro was drafted second overall by the Red Deer Rebels in the 2006 WHL Bantam Draft.

During the 2008–09 season, Ferraro was the leading scorer for the Red Deer Rebels in his second WHL season while playing on a Rebels team that finished last in the Central Division, missing the WHL playoffs. He recorded 37 goals and 18 assists in 68 games.

During the 2009–10 season, Ferraro missed time early in the season due to a knee injury. He recorded 16 goals and 30 assists in 53 games. The much-improved Rebels made the WHL playoffs after finishing fourth in the Central Division. Ferraro skated in three of the four games in the series against Saskatoon and was scoreless.

On July 26, 2010, Ferraro was traded by the Red Deer Rebels to the Everett Silvertips in exchange for Byron Froese and a conditional fifth-round draft pick in the 2012 draft. On September 23, 2010, the Everett Silvertips announced that Ferraro was named captain.

During the 2010–11 season, Ferraro endured a difficult final season in junior hockey. Following a six-game scoring streak in January, he suffered a sports hernia injury, missing the next six weeks of play. He finished the season with ten goals and 17 assists in 41 games. Everett made the playoffs after finishing fourth in the U.S. Division. Ferraro recorded three assists in the four-game series against Portland.

Professional
On November 2, 2010, Ferraro signed a three-year entry-level contract with the Detroit Red Wings. Following the 2010 WHL Playoffs, Ferraro made his professional debut for the Grand Rapids Griffins of the American Hockey League (AHL) on April 9, 2010, in a game against the Lake Erie Monsters.

During the 2011–12 season, in his first full professional season in the AHL, Ferraro recorded nine goals and 11 assists in 56 games, ranking second among Griffins rookies with 20 points. Ferraro recorded his first professional goal on November 11, 2011.

In the 2012–13 season, Ferraro was the third-leading scorer for the Griffins. He recorded a team-high 24 goals and 23 assists in 72 games. Ferraro led the league with seven shorthanded points. The Griffins finished first in the Midwest Division and captured the Calder Cup championship. Ferraro recorded five goals and 11 assists in 24 playoff games.

During the 2013–14 season, Ferraro recorded 15 goals and 16 assists in 70 regular season games and one goal and two assists in nine playoff games for the Griffins.

On March 18, 2014, Ferraro made his NHL debut for the Detroit Red Wings in a game against the Toronto Maple Leafs. On July 25, 2014, Ferraro signed a one-year, two-way contract with the Detroit Red Wings.

On April 11, 2015, Ferraro recorded his first career NHL goal against Cam Ward of the Carolina Hurricanes.

On July 5, 2015, Ferraro signed a one-year, two-way contract with the Detroit Red Wings. During the 2015–16 season, Ferraro appeared in seven games for the Red Wings before suffering a knee injury on November 6, 2015. On November 22, Ferraro was claimed off waivers by the Boston Bruins.

In the off-season, Ferraro was not tendered a contract to remain with the Bruins, and as a free agent, he signed a one-year deal with the St. Louis Blues on July 8, 2016.

On October 8, 2016, Ferraro was placed on waivers by the St. Louis Blues. On October 9, 2016, Ferraro cleared waivers and was assigned to the Blues AHL affiliate, Chicago Wolves. He scored 15 points in 22 games with the Wolves before suffering a season-ending ACL injury which required surgery.

On July 1, 2017, having left the Blues as a free agent, Ferraro signed a two-year, two-way contract with the Minnesota Wild. In the 2017-18 season, Ferraro spent most of the year with the Iowa Wild with the exception of two October NHL games. On October 14, Ferraro scored his first goal as a member of the Wild in a 5-4 OT loss to the Columbus Blue Jackets at Xcel Energy Center.

After two seasons within the Wild organization, Ferraro left as a free agent to later sign his first contract abroad in the 2019–20 season. He agreed to a one-year deal with German club, Eisbären Berlin of the DEL, on October 11, 2019. In 40 regular season games with Berlin, Ferraro contributed with 12 goals and 21 points before the season was cancelled due to the COVID-19 pandemic.

As a free agent, Ferraro continued his career in Germany, initially signing a two-month contract with Löwen Frankfurt of the DEL2 on November 16, 2020. He produced 5 assists through 9 games with Frankfurt before concluding his contract to return to the DEL for the remainder of the 2020–21 season with Kölner Haie on January 15, 2021.

International play

Ferraro made his international debut for Canada Pacific at the 2008 World U-17 Hockey Challenge, where he recorded two goals and two assists in six games.

Ferraro represented Canada at the 2009 IIHF World U18 Championships. He skated in five of six games for Canada at the IIHF World U18 Championship, where he recorded two goals and two assists. Canada won its first four games but finished fourth after losing to the US in the semifinals and Finland in the bronze medal game.

In January 2022, Ferraro was selected to play for Team Canada at the 2022 Winter Olympics.

Personal
Ferraro is the son of the longtime NHL veteran and current TSN Analyst Ray Ferraro. 
Ferraro was born in Trail, British Columbia and lived in the suburbs of New York City, Los Angeles, and Atlanta before moving to the Vancouver suburb of Burnaby with his mother, Tracey, following his parents' divorce. Ferraro has an older brother who played goalie and two younger paternal half-brothers.

Career statistics

Regular season and playoffs

International

Awards and honours

References

External links

1991 births
Boston Bruins players
Canadian ice hockey centres
Chicago Wolves players
Detroit Red Wings draft picks
Detroit Red Wings players
Eisbären Berlin players
Everett Silvertips players
Grand Rapids Griffins players
Ice hockey people from British Columbia
Iowa Wild players
Kölner Haie players
Living people
Löwen Frankfurt players
Minnesota Wild players
Red Deer Rebels players
Sportspeople from Trail, British Columbia
Ice hockey players at the 2022 Winter Olympics
Olympic ice hockey players of Canada